Ahmad Hussain Gilani, also known as Mehboob e Zaat (21 July 1899 – 8 February 1961) was a religious leader, spiritual healer, and Sufi mystic.

Birth and family
Gilani was born in Mundair Kalan, a small village in the Punjab province of Pakistan. His mother and maternal grandfather died before he was eight.

Books on him
 
Muhammad Maruf Shah dedicated a special topic for the introduction of Gilani in his book Anwaar-us-Sadaat on page 161 (1st edition, 1983 publication). Ashfaq Niaz wrote a brief summary of the life of Ahmad Hussain Gilani (1899–1961) in his book Tareekh-e-Sialkot. Biographies of Gilani include:

 Seerat e Mehboob e Zaat (2014)
 Mirrat-ur-Rahman 
(1981)first edition

(2003)Second edition

(2005)Third edition

  Malfozaat-e-Mahboob-e-Zaat(1998)
  (2011)
 Mahboob-e-Zaat (1969)
 Mash'al-e-Raah
 Shajarah-tun-Nabi
 Shajarah haye Nasab o Tareeqat

References
 Hazrat Mahboob-e-Zaat Syed Ahmad Hussain Gilani | PDF | Religious Behaviour And Experience | Religious Belief And Doctrine

Pakistani Sufis
1899 births
1961 deaths
People from Sialkot District